Jan Schröder (16 June 1941 – 4 January 2007) was a Dutch professional road and track cyclist.

Born in Koningsbosch, Schröder won his first professional race in 1961, when he outsprinted Henk Nijdam and Adriaan Biemans in the Omloop der Kempen. A year later he was the strongest in the Ster van Zwolle. His third and final professional win came in 1966 when he won the criterium race in Enter. During his further career he reached three more second places and three more third places in professional road cycling races. In the later part of his career, in 1976 he won a silver medal in the individual pursuit at the Dutch track cycling championships.

Schröder died on 4 January 2007 in his hometown Koningsbosch at the age of 65.

Notable results

1961
 1st in Omloop der Kempen
1962
 2nd in Ronde van Noord-Holland
 1st in Ster van Zwolle
 3rd in Ronde van Limburg
1964
 3rd in Criterium Simpelveld
 3rd in Criterium Rijen
1966
 1st in Criterium Enter
1967
 2nd in Criterium Buggenhout
 2nd in Criterium Neerbeek
1976
 2nd in the individual pursuit at the Dutch national track cycling championships

Professional teams
  Locomotief-Vredestein (1963)
  Acifit (1964)
  Frites Specialist (1965)
  VRP-Locomotief (1966)
  Willem II-Gazelle (1967)

References
 

1941 births
2007 deaths
Dutch male cyclists
Dutch track cyclists
People from Echt-Susteren
Cyclists from Limburg (Netherlands)
20th-century Dutch people
21st-century Dutch people